Colt Prather (born December 10, 1971 in El Paso, Texas) is an American country music singer-songwriter. Prather was discovered playing with the house band at a Nashville restaurant and signed to Epic Records. His third single for the label, "I Won't Go On and On," peaked at number 48 on the Billboard Hot Country Singles & Tracks chart in early 2004. The song received a favorable review from Deborah Evans Price of Billboard, who said that "Prather is the owner of a voice that should easily separate him from the rest of the pack" and "success in the country format is surely forthcoming." By June 2004, Prather had exited the label.

Discography

Singles

References

American country singer-songwriters
American male singer-songwriters
Living people
People from El Paso, Texas
Epic Records artists
1975 births
Singer-songwriters from Texas
21st-century American singers
Country musicians from Texas
21st-century American male singers